is a Japanese professional shogi player ranked 7-dan.

Shogi
Shoshi has written a standard manual on shogi handicap josekis.

Promotion history
The promotion history for Shoshi is as follows:
 5-kyū: 1978
 1-dan: 1980
 4-dan: June 27, 1985
 5-dan: April 1, 1987
 6-dan: October 29, 1992
 7-dan: April 27, 2005

Xiangqi
Shoshi also plays xiangqi representing Japan in world tournaments and won the first prize in 1999, 2003, 2007, and 2015 in the non-Chinese/Vietnamese category.

References

Bibliography

External links
 ShogiHub: Professional Player Info · Shoshi, Kazuharu
 blog: 所司七段ブログ

1961 births
Japanese shogi players
Living people
Professional shogi players
Xiangqi players
Professional shogi players from Tokyo
Free class shogi players
People from Kōtō